Don Luis Carlos Ruspoli y Sanchiz, Morenés y Núñez-Robres, dei Principi Ruspoli GE (born April 4, 1963) is a Spanish aristocrat, and lawyer. He is the son of Luis Ruspoli, 7th Marquis of Boadilla del Monte, and first wife Doña María del Carmen Sanchíz y Núñez-Robres, Arróspide y Rodríguez de Valcárcel (Madrid, February 28, 1940 –), 13th Marchioness of La Casta.

He is the 6th Duke of Alcudia, Grandee of Spain First Class, 6th Duke of Sueca, Grandee of Spain First Class, both with a Coat of Arms of de Godoy and 20th Count of Chinchón Grandee of Spain First Class with a Coat of Arms of de Borbón-Anjou, 8th Marquis of Boadilla del Monte with a Coat of Arms of Ruspoli and Godoy and 3rd Baron of Mascalbo with a Coat of Arms of de Godoy.  In Portugal Conde de Evoramonte. He is also Prince of the Holy Roman Empire, Maestrante de Granada and Caballero del Santo Caliz de Valencia.

Marriage and children 
He married in Madrid, 1992 with Doña María Álvarez de las Asturias Bohorques y Rumeu, de Silva y Cruzat, daughter of Don Luis Álvarez de las Asturias Bohorques y Silva, Goyeneche y Mitjans, son of the Dukes of Gor, and  Doña María Rumeu y Cruzat, de Armas y Suárez de Argudín, daughter of the Marqueses of Casa Argudín, and had four sons:
 Don Carlos Ruspoli y Álvarez de las Asturias Bohorques, Sanchíz y Rumeu, dei Principi Ruspoli (Madrid, August 10, 1993 –). 7th Duke of Alcudia, maestrante de Granada.
 Don Luis Ruspoli y Álvarez de las Asturias Bohorques, Sanchíz y Rumeu, dei Principi Ruspoli (Madrid, August 24, 1994  –). 4th Baron of Mascalbo, maestrante de Granada.
 Don Juan Ruspoli y Álvarez de las Asturias Bohorques, Sanchíz y Rumeu, dei Principi Ruspoli (Madrid, October 20, 1996  –). Maestrante de Granada. 
 Don Jaime Ruspoli y Álvarez de las Asturias Bohorques, Sanchíz y Rumeu, dei Principi Ruspoli (Madrid, March 10, 2000  –). Maestrante de Granada.

Ancestry

References

Sources

See also 
 Ruspoli

1963 births
Living people
Spanish nobility